Jessica Sevick (born July 15, 1989) is an Olympian and National Team Rower from Canada. Sevick was the Pan American Games Champion when she won gold in women's single sculls at the 2019 Pan Am Games in Lima. She studied neuroscience at the University of British Columbia where she competed on the UBC Thunderbirds rowing team.

Sevick along with Gabrielle Smith were named to the double sculls boat for the 2020 Summer Olympics.

References

External links

1989 births
Living people
Canadian female rowers
Pan American Games gold medalists for Canada
Rowers at the 2019 Pan American Games
Rowers from Vancouver
Pan American Games medalists in rowing
Medalists at the 2019 Pan American Games
Olympic rowers of Canada
Rowers at the 2020 Summer Olympics
21st-century Canadian women
World Rowing Championships medalists for Canada